José Sotero Hidalgo Laurel III, KGCR (August 27, 1914 – January 6, 2003) was a Filipino diplomat and the aide-de-camp of President Jose P. Laurel during the World War II period. He later became ambassador of the Philippines to Japan.

Early life
He was born on August 27, 1914. He mastered the Japanese language and culture in the Imperial Japanese Army Academy from 1934 to 1937. He served as a junior aide-de-camp to President Manuel L. Quezon from 1937-1940.

Beginning in March 1945, Laurel, together with his family, Camilo Osías, Benigno Aquino Sr., Gen. Tomas Capinpin, and Jorge B. Vargas evacuated to Baguio. Shortly after the city fell, they traveled to Tuguegarao, where they embarked a bomber plane to Japan via Formosa (now Taiwan) and Shanghai, China. Alongside his father and Aquino, he was taken into U.S. custody on September 15, 1945, days after the Japanese forces formally surrendered to the United States. They were imprisoned in Yokohama until they were transferred to Sugamo Prison on November 16. On July 23, 1946, they left Tokyo for Manila, having been turned over to the Republic of the Philippines.

Career
Laurel was admitted to the Philippine bar on June 10, 1950.

From 1966 to 1971, Laurel served as ambassador of the Philippines to Japan.

In 1976, Laurel initiated the Philippine Federation of Japan Alumni (PHILFEJA), a congregation of former students who graduated in Japanese colleges and universities including grantees of training programs. The association aims to strengthen Philippine-Japan relationship through educational and professional exchanges. He was also active in the Laurel Law Office up to his later years.

Death
Laurel died on January 6, 2003, at the age of 88 due to pneumonia. His remains were cremated.

Personal life
He is the second of nine siblings. He is the son of José P. Laurel with his wife Pacencia Laurel and brother to Jose Jr., Salvador and Sotero Laurel II. He was married to Beatrice Castillo-Laurel with children, including José Laurel V (former Governor of Batangas and former ambassador of the Philippines to Japan) and Ma. Elena Laurel-Loinaz (former president of the Philippine-Japan Ladies Association). He also had 23 grandchildren.

Awards 
:

  Supreme Commander and Knight of the Order of the Knights of Rizal.
 Grand Cross of the Order of Sikatuna, Rank of ‘Datu’ (1987).

References

Ventura, Francesca Murphy. "Contemporary transitions: How developments in Philippines-Japan relations have shaped Japanese language education in the Philippines," paper presented at the 8th International Conference on Philippine Studies (ICOPHIL). Quezon City, Philippines. 23–26 July 2008.
Study Japan Website: List of Associations
PHILJEFA Online:About Us

External links
PHILJEFA Online

1914 births
2003 deaths
Jose III
People from Batangas
Ambassadors of the Philippines to Japan
Filipino collaborators with Imperial Japan
Children of presidents of the Philippines
Prisoners and detainees of the United States military